Oleksiy Pryhorov (born June 25, 1987 in Kharkiv) is a Ukrainian diver who won the bronze medal in the 3 m spring synchro along with Illya Kvasha in the 2008 Summer Olympics in Beijing. The duo won gold at the same event during the 2010 European Aquatics Championships. He participates at the 2019 Red Bull Cliff Diving World Series.

References

External links
Oleksiy Prygorov's profile at ESPN

External links
 Beijing 2008 Profile

1987 births
Living people
Sportspeople from Kharkiv
Olympic bronze medalists for Ukraine
Ukrainian male divers
Divers at the 2008 Summer Olympics
Divers at the 2012 Summer Olympics
Olympic divers of Ukraine
Olympic medalists in diving
Medalists at the 2008 Summer Olympics
Universiade medalists in diving
Male high divers
Universiade silver medalists for Ukraine
Medalists at the 2009 Summer Universiade